Candice Kumai is an American author and chef. Kumai is based in New York City.

Biography 

Candice was born in California to a Japanese mother and Polish-American father.  Kumai worked as a model when she was a teenager. Later, she trained as a professional chef in Southern California, cooking on the line at several restaurants.

Kumai was the youngest chef competing on the first season of Top Chef.

Her approach to cooking is based on her Japanese American heritage. Kumai became the host for Lifetime's show, Cook Yourself Thin.

Kumai has been involved in 1,000 Days, which is an initiative started by Hillary Clinton in 2010 to improve nutrition for mothers and children worldwide. In 2014, she became a Kirin brand ambassador.

Her series of books in the Clean Green series have made the bestseller list of the New York Times. Kumai is also a contributing editor to Shape Magazine.

Books

Television

References

External links
 Official website
 

American television chefs
American cookbook writers
American people of Polish descent
American people of Japanese descent
Asian American chefs
Top Chef contestants
Living people
Year of birth missing (living people)
Women cookbook writers
American women chefs
American women non-fiction writers
21st-century American women